North Manchester Covered Bridge is a historic Smith Type 4 Truss covered bridge located at North Manchester, Wabash County, Indiana.  It was built in 1872 by the Smith Bridge Company of Toledo, Ohio and crosses the Eel River.  It measures 150 feet long and is 18 feet wide.  The bridge has painted board and batten siding.

It was listed on the National Register of Historic Places in 1982.

References

External links

Truss bridges in the United States
Covered bridges on the National Register of Historic Places in Indiana
Bridges completed in 1872
Transportation buildings and structures in Wabash County, Indiana
National Register of Historic Places in Wabash County, Indiana
Road bridges on the National Register of Historic Places in Indiana
Wooden bridges in Indiana